Nigeria competed in the 2014 Commonwealth Games in Glasgow, Scotland from 23 July – 3 August 2014.

Athletics

Men

Women

Shooting

Women
Pistol/Small bore

Men
Pistol/Small bore

Weightlifting

Men

Women

 Powerlifting

Controversy
The youngest female athlete to win a gold medal, Chika Amalaha, failed a dope test and was suspended following her win in the Weightlifting at the 2014 Commonwealth Games – Women's 53 kg.

Wrestling

Men's freestyle

Women's freestyle

References

Nations at the 2014 Commonwealth Games
2014
Commonwealth Games